Luiza Airport  is an airport serving the town of  in Kasaï-Central Province, Democratic Republic of the Congo. It is a local airport with no scheduled airline services.

See also

Transport in the Democratic Republic of the Congo
List of airports in the Democratic Republic of the Congo

References

External links
OpenStreetMap - Luiza Airport
 HERE Maps - Luiza

Airports in Kasaï-Central